Antonín Spěvák (born 14 February 1971) is a retired Czech defender.

References

1971 births
Living people
Czech footballers
FK Hvězda Cheb players
Association football defenders
FK Ústí nad Labem players
AFK Atlantic Lázně Bohdaneč players
FK Kolín players